Herefordshire Constabulary was the Home Office police force for the county of Herefordshire, England, until 1967. The headquarters were at Brockington House, Hafod Road, Hereford.

The force was formed in 1857. Following the Police Act 1946 the Hereford Borough Police merged with the Herefordshire force. In 1965, the county force had an establishment of 257 and an actual strength of 221, making it the second smallest county police force in England after West Suffolk Constabulary.

On 1 October 1967, the force amalgamated with Worcestershire Constabulary, Shropshire Constabulary and Worcester City Police to form West Mercia Constabulary.

Chief Constables
1857–1895 : Captain James Drummond Telfer 
1895–1923 : Captain The Hon. Evelyn Theodore Scudamore-Stanhope 
1923–1929 : Captain Horace Frederick Moncrieff Munro, OBE 
1929–1958 : Freeman Newton, O.B.E. (also Chief Constable of Hereford City)
1958–1967 : Robert McCartney

Footnotes

Defunct police forces of England
History of Herefordshire
Organisations based in Herefordshire
1857 establishments in England
1967 disestablishments in England